Non-functional testing is the testing of a software application or system for its non-functional requirements: the way a system operates, rather than specific behaviours of that system. This is in contrast to functional testing, which tests against functional requirements that describe the functions of a system and its components. The names of many non-functional tests are often used interchangeably because of the overlap in scope between various non-functional requirements. For example, software performance is a broad term that includes many specific requirements like reliability and scalability.

Non-functional testing includes:
Accessibility testing
Baseline testing
Compliance testing
Documentation testing
Endurance testing or reliability testing
Load testing
Localization testing and Internationalization testing
Performance testing
Recovery testing
Resilience testing
Security testing
Scalability testing
Stress testing
Usability testing
Volume testing

Software testing